Len Jenkin (born April 2, 1941) is an American playwright, novelist, screenwriter, and theatrical director. He has won three Obie Awards, including two for writing and directing his 1980 play Limbo Tales.

Born in New York City, Jenkin attended Columbia University. He has also participated in the theatre lab at the Sundance Institute. Jenkin has influenced fellow playwright Mac Wellman in his own teaching.

In addition to his Obie Awards, Jenkin has been awarded a Guggenheim Fellowship and won the Rockefeller Foundation Award. He has been nominated for an Emmy Award and four National Endowment for the Arts fellowships.

As a writer for television, Jenkin has produced scripts for Family, The Incredible Hulk, and ABC Afterschool Special. His novels include New Jerusalem (also a play) and The Secret Life of Billy's Uncle Myron. The latter was written with his daughter Emily Jenkins, better known as the novelist E. Lockhart.

Plays
 Kitty Hawk (1972)
 Gogol: A Mystery Play with Mac Wellman (1976)
 The Death and Life of Jesse James (1978)
 Limbo Tales (1980)
 Five of Us (1981)
 Dark Ride (1982)
 My Uncle Sam (1983)
 Poor Folks' Pleasure (1987)
 Pilgrims of the Night (1991)
 Careless Love (1993)
 Ramona Quimby (1994)
 Like I Say (2003)
 Margo Veil (2008)
 The Dream Express (2009)

References

External links

1941 births
20th-century American dramatists and playwrights
21st-century American dramatists and playwrights
Living people
Writers from New York City